Aphyodite grammica is a species of characin in the tribe Pristellini. It is found in parts of the Essequibo and Amazon river basins in Guyana.

Taxonomy 
Aphyodite was originally described as a monotypic taxon in 1912, but over a century later two more species were described in 2017.

Aphyodite comes from the Greek aphyodes 'sardine-colored'.

References 

Characidae
Taxa named by Carl H. Eigenmann